The men's 100 metres event at the 1997 European Athletics U23 Championships was held in Turku, Finland, on 10 and 11 July 1997.

Medalists

Results

Final
11 July
Wind: 2.8 m/s

Semifinals
10 July
Qualified: first 4 in each to the Final

Semifinal 1
Wind: 1.5 m/s

Semifinal 2
Wind: 3.0 m/s

Heats
10 July
Qualified: first 3 in each heat and 4 best to the Semifinal

Heat 1
Wind: 0.4 m/s

Heat 2
Wind: -1.4 m/s

Heat 3
Wind: 0.6 m/s

Heat 4
Wind: -0.9 m/s

Participation
According to an unofficial count, 31 athletes from 19 countries participated in the event.

 (1)
 (1)
 (2)
 (2)
 (2)
 (2)
 (2)
 (1)
 (1)
 (2)
 (2)
 (2)
 (2)
 (1)
 (2)
 (2)
 (2)
 (1)
 (1)

References

100 metres
100 metres at the European Athletics U23 Championships